Sebnitz is a railway station in the town of Sebnitz, Saxony, Germany. The station lies on the Bautzen–Bad Schandau railway and the Rumburk–Sebnitz railway.

The station is served by DB Regio Südost.

The line into the Czech Republic, to Dolní Poustevna was closed in 1945. In 2012 it was announced that funding had been agreed for the rebuilding and reopening of the line. The new line was opened on 5 July 2014. This work included rebuilding the junction and some hundred metres of track and signalling to the border, from where the track has already been rebuilt.

References

Railway stations in Saxony
Sebnitz
Buildings and structures in Sächsische Schweiz-Osterzgebirge
Railway stations in Germany opened in 1877